Abdoh Hakami (Arabic:عبده حكمي) is a football player who plays as a midfielder .

Honours
Al-Qadisiyah
 First Division: 2001–02, 2008–09

Al-Ittihad
 AFC Champions League: 2005

Al-Ettifaq
 First Division: 2015–16

References

1983 births
Living people
People from Khobar
Association football midfielders
Saudi Arabian footballers
Saudi Arabia youth international footballers
Saudi Arabia international footballers
Al-Qadsiah FC players
Ettifaq FC players
Al-Taawoun FC players
Ittihad FC players
Al-Raed FC players
Hajer FC players
Al-Nahda Club (Saudi Arabia) players
Al-Thoqbah Club players
Al-Taraji Club players
Saudi First Division League players
Saudi Professional League players
Saudi Second Division players